New England Airlines is a regional airline based in Westerly, Rhode Island, USA. With a main base at Westerly State Airport, it provides scheduled service to Block Island and operates charters to other airports along the Northeast coast.

History 
The airline was established and started operations in 1970. New England Airlines has been in continuous service since then, under the same private ownership. It was and is the only scheduled airline with its primary bases of operation in Rhode Island. This was designed to fulfill the loss of service from a short-lived airline called Viking Airways, which folded in the 1960s.

The airline is noted for its provision of cargo delivery services, including Chinese food (and other restaurant orders) delivered from the mainland to the Block Island airport in as little as 90 minutes. The airline only has a half dozen pilots during the winter and over a dozen during the summertime. According to the owner, half of the business comes from charter requests for business workers in the New York area and other locations along the northeast coast.

Destinations for scheduled flights

Fleet 
The New England Airlines fleet consists of the following aircraft:

Accidents 
 November 28, 1989: BN-2 Islander, N127JL, flying to Westerly crashed into the sea 3 to 5 miles northwest of Block Island. All 8 people on board, 7 passengers and pilot John Beck Jr., were killed. Among the victims, Shirley Wood, was the publisher and co-editor of The Block Island Times, founding editor of People magazine, and former chief of research for Time Life Books. The flight proceeded under a cloud layer on a moonless night while a SIGMET was in effect for moderate to occasionally severe turbulence and possible low level wind shear. The reason for the crash was undetermined.
September 5, 1999: A Piper Cherokee PA-32-260, N4830S, departing Westerly on a scheduled flight to Block Island lost control and crashed shortly after take off, killing two passengers and the pilot; two passengers survived with serious injuries. Pilot Michael Hadik was described as a skilled pilot and flight instructor, with 5259 hours total and 202 in the Cherokee. The NTSB final report determined the cause of the crash was loss of control and stall during a turn.

References

External links
New England Airlines

Regional airlines of the United States
Regional Airline Association members
Companies based in Rhode Island
Transportation in Washington County, Rhode Island
Airlines established in 1970
Airlines based in Rhode Island
1970 establishments in Rhode Island
American companies established in 1970